Zuma is a South African surname. Outside of South Africa, it is also prevalent in several other African countries and in Brazil.

Notable people with this surname include:
 Cyril Zuma (1985–2015), South African footballer
 Duduzane Zuma (born 1982), son of Jacob Zuma
 Jacob Zuma (born 1942), former President of South Africa and the African National Congress
 Khulubuse Zuma, South African businessman, nephew of Jacob Zuma
 Lwandiswa Zuma (born 1996), South African cricketer
 Nkosazana Dlamini-Zuma (born 1949), South African politician and anti-apartheid activist
 Sibusiso Zuma (born 1975), South African footballer
 Thuthukile Zuma (born 1989), daughter of Jacob Zuma

Zulu-language surnames